The Straight Horn of Steve Lacy is the third album by Steve Lacy and the first to be released on the Candid label in 1961. It features performances of tunes written by Thelonious Monk, Cecil Taylor, Miles Davis, by Lacy, Charles Davis, John Ore and Roy Haynes.

Reception
The Allmusic review by Scott Yanow awarded the album 5 stars stating "Some of soprano saxophonist Steve Lacy's most interesting recordings are his earliest ones. After spending periods of time playing with Dixieland groups and then with Cecil Taylor (which was quite a jump), Lacy made several recordings that displayed his love of Thelonious Monk's music plus his varied experiences. On this particular set, Lacy's soprano contrasts well with Charles Davis' baritone (they are backed by bassist John Ore and drummer Roy Haynes) on three of the most difficult Monk tunes ("Introspection," "Played Twice," and "Criss Cross") plus two Cecil Taylor compositions and Charlie Parker's "Donna Lee."".

Track listing
 "Louise" (Taylor) - 5:16
 "Introspection" (Monk) - 5:20
 "Donna Lee" (Davis) - 7:41
 "Played Twice" (Monk) - 5:44
 "Air" (Taylor) - 6:27
 "Criss Cross" (Monk) - 5:37

Recorded at Nola Penthouse Sound Studios, NY, November 19, 1960

Personnel
Steve Lacy - soprano saxophone
Charles Davis - baritone saxophone
John Ore - bass
Roy Haynes - drums

References 

1961 albums
Steve Lacy (saxophonist) albums
Candid Records albums